Zinc finger protein 620 is a protein that in humans is encoded by the ZNF620 gene.

References

Further reading 

Human proteins